Lewis Young (born 20 December 1998) is a professional Australian rules footballer playing for the Carlton Football Club in the Australian Football League (AFL). He was drafted by the Western Bulldogs with their third selection and forty-ninth overall in the 2016 national draft. He made his debut in the twenty point win against  at Etihad Stadium in round seventeen of the 2017 season.

Statistics
 Statistics are correct to the end of the 2020 season

|-
|-
! scope="row" style="text-align:center" | 2017
|style="text-align:center;"|
| 33 || 7 || 0 || 0 || 48 || 42 || 90 || 38 || 12 || 0.0 || 0.0 || 6.9 || 6.0 || 12.9 || 5.4 || 1.7
|- style="background-color: #EAEAEA"
! scope="row" style="text-align:center" | 2018
|style="text-align:center;"|
| 2 || 2 || 0 || 0 || 14 || 5 || 19 || 4 || 8 || 0.0 || 0.0 || 7.0 || 2.5 || 9.5 || 2.0 || 4.0
|-
! scope="row" style="text-align:center" | 2019
|style="text-align:center;"|
| 2 || 5 || 0 || 0 || 47 || 14 || 61 || 21 || 4 || 0.0 || 0.0 || 9.4 || 2.8 || 12.2 || 4.2 || 0.8
|-style="background-color: #EAEAEA"
! scope="row" style="text-align:center" | 2020
|style="text-align:center;"|
| 2 || 1 || 0 || 1 || 3 || 1 || 4 || 3 || 0 || 0.0 || 1.0 || 3.0 || 1.0 || 4.0 || 3.0 || 0.0
|- class="sortbottom"
! colspan=3| Career
! 15
! 0
! 1
! 112
! 62
! 174
! 66
! 24
! 0.0
! 0.1
! 7.5
! 4.1
! 11.6
! 4.4
! 1.6
|}

Notes

References

External links

1998 births
Living people
Western Bulldogs players
Sturt Football Club players
Australian rules footballers from South Australia
Carlton Football Club players